Elisabeta Știrbey (1805–1874), was a Princess consort of Wallachia.

Early life 
Born into an old Phanariote noble family which claimed descent from Byzantine Emperors, she was the daughter of Prince Grigore Cantacuzino-Pașcanu (1779–1808) and his wife, Princess Elena Brâncoveanu (1787–1809), descendant of Constantin Brâncoveanu.

Biography 
From 1825, Elisabeta and her husband lived in Bucharest, where their palace at the Calea Victoriei became a center of social life, where she became known for the grand balls she regularly arranged. She was also a noted philanthropist. In 1839, she had French educational work by Jeanne Campan translated to Romanian, and in 1843, she founded the first Romanian language school for girls.

Personal life 
In 1820, she married Prince Barbu Dimitrie Știrbei, the son of Boyar Dumitrache Bibescu, Palatine of Wallachia (1772-1831), and his wife, Ecaterina Văcărescu (1777-1842). They had:
 Princess Fenareta Stirbey (1822-1894); married Prince Theodor Ghica (1820-1865) and had issue
 Princess Elize Stirbey (1827-1890); married Ştefan Bellu (1824-1902) and had issue
 Princess Elena Stirbey (1831-1864); married Count Leo Larisch von Mönnich (1824-1872) and had issue
 Prince Alexandru Stirbey (1836-1895); married Princess Maria Ghica-Comănești (1851-1885) and had issue
 Prince Dimitrie Stirbey (1842-1913); married Alexandrine von Soyka (1857-1931) and had issue

References

 Oana Marinache, Reședințele Știrbey din București și Buftea, Editura ACS, București, 2013

1805 births
1874 deaths
19th-century Romanian women
Romanian philanthropists
Royal consorts of Wallachia
Elisabeta
Elisabeta
19th-century philanthropists